Chiayi Park is a park at East District, Chiayi City, Taiwan.

History
The park was built in 1911 during the Japanese era. It was once renamed to Zhongshan Park in 1949, but reverted to its current name in 1997.

Architecture
The park spans over an area of 26.8 hectares. The park features the Sun-Shooting Tower, Chiayi Confucian Temple and Kagi Shrine.

Transportation
Chiayi City Bus Urban Line 6
Chiayi BRT BRT1(7211)

See also
 List of parks in Taiwan

References

1911 establishments in Taiwan
Landforms of Chiayi
Parks established in 1911
Parks in Taiwan
Tourist attractions in Chiayi